The St. Norbert Green Knights are teams representing St. Norbert College in 23 sports in NCAA Division III athletics. The Green Knights joined the Northern Athletics Collegiate Conference (NACC) in July 2020 after 38 years in the Midwest Conference           (MWC). Prior to joining the NACC full-time, St. Norbert had been a member of that league in men's volleyball in the 2020 season (2019–20 school year), the school's first in that sport.

Teams

Ice hockey
The St. Norbert hockey program is coached by Tim Coghlin and has won five national championships under his leadership.

International competition:

In 2006, Maris Ziedins represented Latvia at the Winter Olympics in Turin, Italy. 

In 2023, Brendan Mark and Michael
McChesney won silver medals with Team USA at the World University Games in Lake Placid, NY. SNC alum an assistant coach for USA.  Adam Stachowiak represented Slovakia.

Football

Softball

References

External links